Shelley Lee Lai-kuen  is a former senior official in the Hong Kong Government. She was known as Shelley Lau with her full name Shelley Lau Lee Lai-kuen before she divorced in 2000. Lee retired in 2005 from the civil service as the permanent secretary for home affairs, after a distinguished 34-year career in public service. Lee has made exemplary contributions to the development of Hong Kong and is well respected for her compassion towards those in difficulties.

Education
In 1971, Lee graduated from the University of Hong Kong where she studied English literature in the Arts Faculty. In 1985, Lee graduated from Harvard University Kennedy School of Government with a Master of Public Administration degree. Lee also completed the six-week Advanced Management Programme of the Harvard Business School in 2000. 

In her earlier years, Lee attended the Maryknoll Convent School.

Career
In 1971, Lee joined the Hong Kong Government as an executive officer and subsequently transferred to the Administrative Service in August 1972. She rose to the rank of administrative officer staff grade A1 in September 2004.

Lee was the first woman to take on the post of private secretary to the former governor Baron MacLehose.  

During her 33 years of service in the Administrative Service, Lee has served in a number of senior positions including: deputy secretary-general, Office of Members of the Executive and Legislative Councils (September 1986 – August 1989); commissioner for recreation and culture (October 1989 – June 1991); secretary-general, Office of Members of the Executive and Legislative Councils (June 1991 – February 1993); deputy secretary for health and welfare (February 1993 – July 1995); and director of home affairs (August 1995 – June 2002). She became permanent secretary for home affairs in the principal officials shakeup of July 2002, retiring from civil service in October 2005.

Over the years, Lee has been active in promoting women's and children's rights and welfare within the Civil Service. During the SARS crisis, she set up the We Care Education Fund for children of the deceased alongside Carrie Lam, Fanny Law and Margaret Chan. She is a founding member and former chairman of the Association of Female Senior Government Officers formed in 1979, where she worked closely with other female senior civil servants, notably, Anson Chan, Elizabeth Wong and Katherine Fok Lo Shiu-ching, to successfully fight for equal remuneration terms for married women in the Civil Service. This was achieved in 1981. As a result of such achievements, Lee is considered to be an early member of the 「手袋黨」—the "handbag party".  

Lee is known fondly to the public, particularly in the education, health and welfare sectors as the "Community Godmother", 「眾人媽打」, or simply 「媽打」. This is in tribute to her warmth and sincere care and concern for the underprivileged, the orphaned and victims of catastrophes.

Radio talk show
On 28 March 2012, Radio Television Hong Kong announced that Lee will co-host a radio talk show called【七百萬人的先鋒】with 區家麟. For this show, Lee will interview "50 Successful Women in Hong Kong" including: Elsie Tu, Ann Hui, Elizabeth Wong, Rosanna Wong, etc. The first show will air on RTHK Radio 1 on 7 April 2012.

Awards
In 2004, Lee received an honorary fellowship from the University of Hong Kong. In 2006, Lee received the Gold Bauhinia Star.

References

External links
Profile

Living people
Hong Kong people of Hakka descent
People from Xingning
Government officials of Hong Kong
1949 births
Alumni of the University of Hong Kong
Harvard Kennedy School alumni
Hong Kong women in politics
Recipients of the Gold Bauhinia Star